In algebra, a simple Lie algebra is a Lie algebra that is non-abelian and contains no nonzero proper ideals. The classification of real simple Lie algebras is one of the major achievements of Wilhelm Killing and Élie Cartan. 

A direct sum of simple Lie algebras is called a semisimple Lie algebra.

A simple Lie group is a connected Lie group whose Lie algebra is simple.

Complex simple Lie algebras 

To each finite-dimensional complex semisimple Lie algebra , there exists a corresponding diagram (called the Dynkin diagram) where the nodes denote the simple roots, the nodes are jointed (or not jointed) by a number of lines depending on the angles between the simple roots and the arrows are put to indicate whether the roots are longer or shorter. All possible connected Dynkin diagrams are the following:

where n is the number of the nodes (the simple roots). The correspondence of the diagrams and complex simple Lie algebras is as follows:
(An) 
(Bn) 
(Cn) 
(Dn) 
The rest, exceptional Lie algebras.

Real simple Lie algebras 
If  is a finite-dimensional real simple Lie algebra, its complexification is either (1) simple or (2) a product of a simple complex Lie algebra and its conjugate. Thus, a real simple Lie algebra can be classified by the classification of complex simple Lie algebras and some additional information. This can be done by Satake diagrams that generalize Dynkin diagrams. See also Table of Lie groups#Real Lie algebras for a partial list of real simple Lie algebras.

Notes

See also 
 Simple Lie group
 Vogel plane

References 
 
 Jacobson, Nathan, Lie algebras, Republication of the 1962 original. Dover Publications, Inc., New York, 1979.  ; Chapter X considers a classification of simple Lie algebras over a field of characteristic zero.

Lie algebras